Aikenhead's Hardware was a chain of Canadian hardware stores located in Greater Toronto, Southern Ontario and northern Ontario. The original store was founded in Toronto in 1830 as "Ridout's Hardware Store" by Joseph Ridout and was located on the corner of King Street and Yonge Street.

In 1868, two employees, James Aikenhead and Alexander Crombie, became partners in the company and renamed it "Ridout, Aikenhead, & Crombie". It became Aikenhead's in 1893, when Aikenhead bought out Ridout and Crombie.

In 1971 the Aikenhead family sold their chain to Molson, which later started a warehouse in 1991 to head off American chain The Home Depot.  Molson sold their 75% stake to Home Depot in 1994, and it became the Canadian unit. (Molson exited the hardware business with the sale of Beaver Lumber in 1999 to Home Hardware, which they had acquired a year after the purchase of Aikenhead's.)

References

The Home Depot
Defunct retail companies of Canada
Hardware stores of Canada
Companies based in Toronto
Retail companies established in 1830
Retail companies disestablished in 1994
1830 establishments in Upper Canada
1994 disestablishments in Ontario
Molson Coors Beverage Company
Canadian companies disestablished in 1994